Leon Jastremski (July 17, 1843 - November 29, 1907) was a French-born Confederate soldier, journalist, and the three-term mayor of Baton Rouge, Louisiana. During his mayoralty, he fought and was instrumental in making Baton Rouge the state capital again. He was a co-founder of the United Confederate Veterans. He wrote political articles as a newspaper editor, including an editorial noted for its advocacy of racial segregation.

Early life
Leon Jastremski was born to an aristocratic family in Soulon, France. His father, Vincent Jastremski, was a Polish Jewish emigre, where he had studied medicine and married before moving with his family to Louisiana. Jastremski was born in the castle of Count de Pontaut. Jastremski's parents and siblings left for the United States, while he was under the care of his mother's relatives until six. He went to the United States in 1852 or 1853, joining his family. Both of his parents died in 1856, leaving him an orphan. After their deaths, he worked as a printer's apprentice.

American Civil War
During the Civil War, he served as a private in the 10th Louisiana Infantry Regiment and for a time was with Col. Walerian Sułakowski's brigade in Virginia. He fought against the Union at the Battle of Malvern Hill on July 1, 1862 and was captured and imprisoned at Fort Delaware. After he was released, he fought at the Battle of Cedar Mountain, Second Battle of Bull Run, Battle of Chantilly, Battle of Harpers Ferry, and Battle of Antietam. He rose to the ranks of captain and was captured for a third time at the Battle of Spotsylvania Court House on May 12, 1864. He was wounded twice during his service in the Confederate Army, once in the throat and another in the hand. At one time during the war, his brigade was in battle against a Union brigade led by another Polish exile, Włodzimierz Krzyżanowski.

Jastremski was a founding member of the United Confederate Veterans, created in 1889. He suggested creating it after attending a meeting of the Grand Army of the Republic.

Political career
After the war he moved to Baton Rouge to work at his brother's drug store. In 1876 he was elected mayor of Baton Rouge with the support of former members of the Knights of the White Camelia. As mayor he was instrumental in restoring Baton Rouge as the state capital, and was re-elected twice.

Jastremski elected chairman of the Democratic State Central Committee, and led Grover Cleveland's presidential campaign in Louisiana. He was U.S. consul to Peru from 1893 to 1897, was appointed state commissioner of agriculture, and later served as a private secretary to the governor. Historian Donald Everett noted that Jastremski, despite his place in important leadership roles, never "received more than superficial attention". He ran for governor in 1904 without success but died before the 1908 gubernatorial election, which he also campaigned for, could be held. Historian James S. Pula suggests that racist ideology and white southern populism were likely used in his campaign platforms.

Personal life and death
Jastremski married Rose Larguier on July 1, 1867. He attended church at the church that would later become St. Joseph Cathedral.

Despite his Polish name and ethnic background, he was born in France and wrote to his own family in French. In his biography Pills, Pens, & Politics, Edward Pinkowski found numerous Polish immigrants in Baton Rouge existed during his time, but there is no convincing proof that he was friends with them or took a paternalistic attitude towards them as mayor. Jastremski's documents and letters are held at Louisiana State University.

Jastremski died on November 29, 1907.

References
 Pula, James. Polish American Encyclopedia. p. 205.
 Edward Pinkowski. ''Pills, Pen & Politics: The story of Leon Jastremski: 1843-1907.

1843 births
1907 deaths
People of Louisiana in the American Civil War
American politicians of Polish descent
French emigrants to the United States
Confederate States Army officers
Mayors of Baton Rouge, Louisiana
Writers from Baton Rouge, Louisiana
Louisiana Democrats
American diplomats
Jewish Confederates